Ghaleychi (also Romanized as Qaleychī; also known as Qal‘eh ichi) is a village in Baleghlu Rural District, in the Central District of Ardabil County, Ardabil Province, Iran. At the 2016 census, its population was 73, in 37 families.

References 

Towns and villages in Ardabil County